The 1985 South African motorcycle Grand Prix was the first round of the 1985 Grand Prix motorcycle racing season. It took place on the weekend of 22–23 March 1985 at the Kyalami circuit. This was the last South African GP held due to the Apartheid policies which were in place in the country and the subsequent boycott from many sport associations (such as the FIM and the FIA) that followed, until the return of motorcycle racing to the new Kyalami circuit in 1992.

Classification

500 cc

References

South African motorcycle Grand Prix
South African
Motorcycle
March 1985 sports events in Africa